Ralph Siegel (born 30 September 1945) is a German record producer and songwriter. Siegel is one of the most notable figures at the Eurovision Song Contest, in which he has participated with 24 songs so far, among them the 1982 winner song Ein bisschen Frieden.

Life and career 
Siegel is a prolific producer in the German genre of Schlager music. Since the early 1970s, he worked with artists like Udo Jürgens, Mary Roos, Heino, Rex Gildo, Michael Holm, Chris Roberts, Costa Cordalis, Mireille Mathieu, Peter Alexander, Roy Black, Karel Gott and Marianne Rosenberg.

Since 1972 has participated with 24 songs in the Eurovision Song Contest, the latest being the 2017 Sammarinese entry "Spirit of the Night" by Valentina Monetta and Jimmie Wilson. 

In 1982, Siegel's and Bernd Meinunger's song Ein bißchen Frieden (A Little Peace), performed by Nicole won the Contest and became a hit in Europe. In 2003, both writers had success with Let's Get Happy, performed by Lou which came in 11th. In February 2010, it was announced by RTÉ that he would have an entry in the Irish National Final-Eurosong 2010. The song titled River of Silence was performed by Lee Bradshaw. It finished in last place. He also composed 'C'était ma vie', performed by Lys Assia for representing Switzerland in the Eurovision Song Contest. She reached an 8th position in Swiss National Final.

Siegel organized a comeback event for the Disco band Dschinghis Khan in June 2018. Dschinghis Khan had been originally organized by Siegel and Dr. Bernd Meinunger to compete in the 1979 Eurovision Song Contest. After the success of their first hit, Dschinghis Khan, both men continued to write popular songs for this band, including "Moskau" and "Hadschi Halef Omar". Siegel makes a rare appearance playing classical guitar in 1984 video footage of Dschinghis Khan performing "Corrida" and "Olé Olé".

In 2021, Siegel premiered his musical Zeppelin.

Personal life 

Ralph Siegel's first marriage was to Dunja Siegel from Slovakia in 1975, with whom he had two daughters Giulia Siegel (born 1974) and Marcella Siegel (born 1976). The couple divorced in 1989.

In 1992 he married Dagmar Kögel, (née Weber). His third daughter Alana Siegel was born in 1996. The couple separated in 2002.

His third marriage to the soprano Kriemhild Siegel, (née Jahn), lasted from 2006 until the official separation in August 2014. The legal divorce then took place in 2016.

In 2015 he met the Swiss music manager Laura Käfer. After a 3-year relationship, the couple got married in September 2018 in the church Grünwald near Munich. Laura Siegel brought her daughter Ruby Siegel (born 2000), (née Käfer) into the marriage.

Eurovision Song Contest participations

National final participations

References

1945 births
Living people
German songwriters
German record producers
Eurovision Song Contest winners
Germany in the Eurovision Song Contest
Musicians from Munich
Officers Crosses of the Order of Merit of the Federal Republic of Germany